Tyudrala (Ĵodralu) is a rural locality (a selo) in Ust-Kansky District, the Altai Republic, Russia. The population was 289 as of 2016. There are 3 streets.

Geography 
Tyudrala is located 22 km northwest of Ust-Kan (the district's administrative centre) by road. Kaysyn is the nearest rural locality.

References 

Rural localities in Ust-Kansky District